Sara Renee Randolph (born February 27, 1983) is an American former soccer player who played as a defender, making two appearances for the United States women's national team.

Career
Randolph played youth soccer for Hurricane FC in Oklahoma, before joining Hammer FC in Cincinnati. She played for the Sycamore Aviators in high school, where she was an NSCAA All-American in 1999, and Parade High-School All-American in 2001. In college, she played for the North Carolina Tar Heels from 2001 to 2004, where she was a letter-winner and won the 2003 NCAA Division I Women's Soccer Tournament. She was a Soccer America First-Team All-American in 2001, as well as a Soccer Buzz Second-Team selection in the same year. She was included in the ACC All-Freshman Team and NCAA All-Tournament Team in 2001. In total, she scored 6 goals and recorded 15 assists in 98 appearances for the Tar Heels.

Randolph played for the U.S. under-16 national team in November 1999, as well as the under-19 team in 2001. She made her international debut for the United States on March 7, 2001 in a friendly match against Italy. She earned her second and final cap on March 13, 2001 in the 2001 Algarve Cup against Portugal.

Personal life
Randolph was born in Denver, Colorado, though Cincinnati is her hometown.

Career statistics

International

References

External links
 High School Sports Player Diary: Sara Randolph at ESPN

1983 births
Living people
Soccer players from Denver
American women's soccer players
United States women's international soccer players
Women's association football defenders
North Carolina Tar Heels women's soccer players